Carex squarrosa is a species of sedge (genus Carex), native to the central and eastern United States, and Ontario in Canada. It is typically found in bottomland hardwood forests and other wet habitats.

References

squarrosa
Flora of Eastern North America
Taxa named by Carl Linnaeus
Plants described in 1753